James McKeever (April 19, 1861 – August 19, 1897), was an American professional baseball catcher. He played in Major League Baseball for the Boston Reds in 1884.

Early years
McKeever was born in 1861 in Saint John, New Brunswick, the son of Irish immigrants. He moved to Boston with his parents at age three. He was boyhood friends in South Boston with Tommy McCarthy, who was later inducted into the Baseball Hall of Fame. He graduated from the Lawrence School in Boston in 1875 and became employed by the Norway Iron Company.

Baseball career
McKeever played baseball "as a business" for several years for teams in the Boston area. 

In April 1884, he signed with the Boston Reds in the Union Association. The Baltimore Sun reported that McKeever was working at a South Boston foundry before signing his first professional contract with the Reds. The Boston Globe reported that he was "a large man with no previous pro experience" who would be positioned at catcher and serve as one half of Boston's "change battery" with pitcher Charlie Daniels. A biography of McKeever in The National Pastime described him as "a strong defensive catcher" who was "unable to hit successfully against the suspect UA pitching." During his major-league career, he appeared in 16 games and scored 13 runs with a .136 batting average, before he was released along with Fred Tenney in August. 

McKeever later played for several years for clubs in Biddeford, Maine (1885), Waterbury (1885), Minneapolis (1887), Eau Claire, Wisconsin (1887), Easton, Pennsylvania (1888), Haverhill, Massachusetts, Lowell, Massachusetts, and Oil City, Pennsylvania (1895). He also later played for the Boston-based clubs Woven Hose in 1890, the Whittentons in 1891, and Institute in 1893.

He played principally at the catcher position but also appeared as a right fielder, center fielder, and first baseman. He was described in the Star Tribune in 1887 as a "fine back stop" and an "excellent thrower" with endurance that allowed him to catch up to five games a week.

Poor health led to his retirement as a player during the 1895 season. He thereafter served as manager of a semipro team in Boston.

Death
On August 19, 1897, Mckeever died "after an illness of five weeks of brain fever". At the time of his death, the South Boston Bulletin called him "one of the best known ball players about Boston." He was buried at Holy Cross Cemetery in Malden, Massachusetts.

References

External links

1861 births
1897 deaths
19th-century baseball players
Baseball people from New Brunswick
Biddeford (minor league baseball) players
Boston Reds (UA) players
Canadian expatriate baseball players in the United States
Eau Claire (minor league baseball) players
Easton (minor league baseball) players
Haverhill (minor league baseball) players
Major League Baseball players from Canada
Major League Baseball catchers
Minneapolis Millers (baseball) players
Newburyport Clamdiggers players
Sportspeople from Saint John, New Brunswick
Waterbury (minor league baseball) players